Adolfo Bruno (November 24, 1945 – November 23, 2003), also known as "Big Al", was an Italian-born American mobster who was a caporegime with the Genovese crime family based in New York City, who ran an organized crime operation out of Springfield, Massachusetts.

Criminal career
Bruno was born in Bracigliano, Campania, Italy on November 24, 1945, and immigrated to the United States at the age of 10, settling in Springfield.

In 1984 Bruno was one of several individuals arrested in a multi-state gambling ring along with Amadeo Santinelo.
In 1987, Bruno was sentenced to five years in prison. Bruno's codefendants included Mario Fiore, Anthony "Turk" Scibelli, Ricky S. Songini, Felix Tranghese, Albert "Baba" Scibelli, and Donald Pepe.

In 1990, Bruno was at the center of a controversy that many believe cut short the career of longtime Hampden County District Attorney Matthew Ryan Jr. when a top aide accused the DA of being soft on mobsters like Bruno. Ryan, a frequent racquetball partner of Bruno's, denied the allegations but retired that year.
  
In 1991, Bruno was charged with attempted murder in a gang-related shooting in Agawam, Massachusetts, but later acquitted in 1994. Prosecutors claimed that Bruno and co-defendant John J."Jake" Nettis shot convicted bookmaker Joseph Maruca in a barn owned by Bruno's brother Frank. State prosecutors used reformed Philadelphia crime family hitman Phil Leonetti as a government witness. Nettis was convicted and received a nine to ten year state prison sentence.

In 1993, Vito Ricciardi, a Springfield barber, shot at Bruno twice, but missing, outside the Society of Our Lady of Mount Carmel Club in Springfield over an unpaid debt.

In 1996, Bruno and Francesco J."Skyball" Scibelli were sentenced to 15 months in prison for illegal gambling. Also charged was son Anthony Bruno made member of the Genovese crime family. Hit man was sentenced to 10 years for attempted murder racketeering, money laundering, intimidating a witness.

Death
On November 23, 2003, after having dinner with his family, Bruno drove to the Society of Our Lady of Mount Carmel Club to play a few hands of briscola. After leaving the club, he was shot five times and killed in the parking lot.

In 2004, Frankie Roche, a fringe player in Springfield rackets, was arrested in Tampa, Florida as the suspected shooter. Roche pled guilty in 2008 and was sentenced to nearly 14 years in prison. On February 17, 2010, Manhattan federal court announced a 13-count indictment charging Arthur Nigro and Anthony Arillotta, of the Genovese crime family, with various racketeering crimes, including the murder of Bruno. On July 23, 2010, Felix Tranghese and Ty Geas were arrested in Springfield; in their capacities associated with the Genovese family, Nigro, Tranghese, Emilio Fusco, Fotios Geas, and Ty Geas conspired to murder and aided and abetted in the murder of Bruno, to maintain and increase their position in the Genovese family, as well as to prevent Bruno from providing information to law enforcement about crimes committed by members and associates of the Genovese family. On May 16, 2011, it was announced that Fusco had been extradited from Italy to the United States, arriving in New York three days prior. Nigro had given the order to murder Bruno; Fusco and others had conspired to carry out the murder. Roche, imprisoned for the murder and hoping that his testimony would speed his release, testified that he had killed Bruno for a promised payment of $10,000. On September 12, 2011, Nigro and Genovese family associates Fotios Geas and Ty Geas, who planned the murder, were each sentenced to life in prison for several crimes in Manhattan federal court.

References

External links

1945 births
2003 deaths
Genovese crime family
Murdered American gangsters of Italian descent
People murdered in Massachusetts
Deaths by firearm in Massachusetts
People from Springfield, Massachusetts
People acquitted of attempted murder